David Moser (born 24 March 1989) is a Swiss football goalkeeper. He currently plays for FC Winterthur.

He has played for FC Thun in the Swiss Super League.

References

External links
Soccerbase

1989 births
Living people
Swiss men's footballers
Association football goalkeepers
People from Thun
FC Thun players
Sportspeople from the canton of Bern